Super Rock '84 in Japan was a touring rock festival held in Japan from 4 to 12 August 1984 in Nagoya, Fukuoka, Osaka and Tokorozawa. The lineup included Bon Jovi, Whitesnake, Scorpions, Michael Schenker Group and Anvil. A sequel, Super Rock '85 in Japan, occurred 10 August 1985 in Tokyo, Japan.

References

Heavy metal festivals in Japan
1984 in Japan